The Church of Saint Andrew the Apostle is a Catholic church in Kryvičy, Belarus, built in 1776–1796 in Baroque style.

History 
The church was established in 1770 as a part of the Trinitarians' monastery. The first wooden church was replaced by a stone one in 1796. In the same year the church was consecrated in the name of Andrew the Apostle by the bishop Troksky. The monastery operated until 1830, when it was closed by the authorities in the aftermath of the November Uprising. When the monastery was suppressed, all its buildings were given to the parish.

Architecture 
The church is a one-naved basilica with a square apse and a high three-storey bell tower at the main front and an adjacent two-storey dormitory on the southeast side. The nave is covered with a cylindrical vault. The main altar dominates the Baroque interior. Its wooden statue of Christ is a copy of the one in Antakalnis. Adam Kirkor wrote in 1855 that both statues were brought from Rome.

Gallery

References

Sources 
 Дзяржаўны спіс гісторыка-культурных каштоўнасцей Рэспублікі Беларусь: Даведнік ed. V.Y. Ablamski, I.M. Charnyavski, Y.A. Barysyuk. Minsk: BELTA 2009, 
 Каталіцкія храмы Беларусі: Энцыкл. даведнік. А.М. Kulagin, photographs by A.L. Dibovski. Minsk: BELTA 2008 (2nd edn.), 
 Каталіцкія святыні. Мінска-Магілёўская архідыяцэзія. Ч. 1. Будслаўскі, Вілейскі і Мінскі дэканаты. А. Yaromenki with introduction by Ul. Trotsevskii. Minsk: VUP "Pro Christ", 2003, 
 Наследие архитектуры Беларуси. Монастыри восточной и заадной традиций. I.N. Slyunkova. Moscow: Progress-Traditsiya, 2002
 Мураваныя харалы: Сакральная архітэктура беларускага барока. T.V. Habrus. Minsk: Urajai, 2001, 

18th-century Roman Catholic church buildings in Belarus
Churches in Belarus
Landmarks in Belarus